The Ogun State Broadcasting Organization, also known by its acronym OGBC, is the public-service broadcaster of Ogun State, Nigeria.
 The OGBC operates a radio station on 90.5 MHz in the state capital of Abeokuta.

See also
Ogun State Television

References

Radio stations in Nigeria
Ogun State
Public broadcasting in Nigeria
Radio stations established in 1977
1977 establishments in Nigeria